Chairmen of the Legislative Chamber of the State Assembly of Bashkortostan

Footnotes and references

Lists of legislative speakers in Russia
Chairmen